The Guan people are an ethnic group found almost in all parts of Ghana, including the Nkonya tribe, the Gonja, Anum, Larteh, Nawuri and Ntsumburu.

They primarily speak the Guan languages of the Niger-Congo language family. They make up 3.7% of the population of Ghana.

Guans are believed to be the first settlers in the modern day Ghana that migrated from the Mossi region of modern Burkina around 1000 A.D.  However, some of these Guan languages are influenced by major languages in Ghana, depending on where a particular Guan tribe is located.  Guans in the Eastern region include Anum, Boso, Larteh, Okere, and Kyerepong. Guans in the Oti Region include Buem, Nkonya, Likpe, Santrokofi, Akpafu etc. Guans in the Volta Region include Avatime, Logba etc. In the central region we have the Efutu, Awutu and Senya and Bawjiase areas. The Gonja people are in the north and part of Brong Ahafo, Bono and Ahafo. The Nawuri people live in parts of North and Parts of Oti Region, they mostly live at the eastern end of Salaga district; on the west bank of the Volta Lake/Oti River, some 70 kilometers north of Kete Krachi. Guans being the first settlers in Ghana, some were assimilated into the cultures of the major ethnic groups in the various regions we have today. Thus, some indigenes of Kpeshie in Greater Accra and Nzema, Sefwi, Ahanta etc. in the Western and Western Noth region may also trace their roots to Guans. The indigenes of most of the Fantes in the central region including Asebu, Edina(Elmina), Ogua(Cape Coast),Aguafo etc. as well as Agona can also trace their origins from Guans. At present it is accepted that the Guan people can be found in twelve (12) regions in Ghana: Oti, Northern, North East, Savannah, Bono, Ahafo, Central, Western North, Western, Eastern, Volta and Brong Ahafo Regions. They are very tolerant and live as commoners in their various environment. They speak the languages of the major ethnic group where they are found natively and speak their distinct languages at home.

References

Ethnic groups in Ghana